Make a Wish most commonly refers to:

 Make-A-Wish Foundation, a charitable foundation

Make a Wish may also refer to:

Music
 Make a Wish (musical), a 1951 stage musical and soundtrack album
 Make a Wish (Vic Chou album), 2002
 Make a Wish (Kevin Sharp album), 2004
 "Make a Wish", a 2008 song by Charlene Choi
 "Make a Wish", a 2008 song by Flo Rida from Mail on Sunday
 "Make a Wish", a song by Jordan Cahill from the film Stuck in the Suburbs
 "Make a Wish", song by Brian Wilson from Gettin' In Over My Head
 "Make a Wish", song from the English version of the film Pokémon: Jirachi Wish Maker
 "Make A Wish (Birthday Song)", song by NCT U, from NCT 2020 Resonance

Film and television
 Make a Wish (TV series), a children's program airing from 1971 to 1976
 "Make a Wish", episode of 1994 Spider-Man TV series
 Make a Wish (1937 film), a film starring Basil Rathbone
 Make a Wish (2006 film), a short film by Cherien Dabis
 Make a Wish (2011 film), a short film
 Make a Wish (2014 TV series), South Korean television series